Michael Platt Winstanley, Baron Winstanley (27 August 1918 – 18 July 1993) was the Liberal Member of Parliament (MP) for Cheadle from 1966 to 1970 and, after boundary changes, for Hazel Grove, a newly created seat comprising half his former seat, from February to October 1974.

Early life
Winstanley was born in Nantwich, Cheshire, to Sydney Adams Winstanley (1878-1953), GP. He was educated at Manchester Grammar School and the University of Manchester where he was President of the University Union and captain of cricket. He graduated in medicine and served in the RAMC before becoming a general practitioner in Urmston.

Television career
Winstanley became a media personality as a television and radio doctor in the 1960s. Between 1972 and 1986, he presented Granada Television's This Is Your Right, an early-evening, five-minute consumer advice and legal rights bulletin which ultimately credited him as Lord Michael Winstanley.

Politics
Following his return to the House of Commons in 1974, Winstanley discovered that he held a post which would disqualify him from being a member of the House of Commons, medical officer at a Royal Ordnance Factory that amounted to employment in the Civil Service of the Crown. On 3 April 1974, the Commons passed a motion under section 6 of the House of Commons Disqualification Act 1957 to override the disqualification and allow Winstanley to sit.

Honours
Winstanley was created a life peer on 23 January 1976 with the title Baron Winstanley, of Urmston in Greater Manchester. He was chairman of the Countryside Commission from 1978 to 1980.

Personal life
Winstanley's daughter, Diana, became a highly respected academic and teacher at Kingston University, where bursaries are offered in her memory. His niece is journalist and newsreader Anna Ford.

References

External links 

Obituary in The Independent

1918 births
1993 deaths
People from Nantwich
Liberal Party (UK) MPs for English constituencies
Life peers
UK MPs 1966–1970
UK MPs 1974
UK MPs who were granted peerages
20th-century English medical doctors
English television presenters
Alumni of the Victoria University of Manchester
People educated at Manchester Grammar School
Liberal Party (UK) life peers
Members of the Parliament of the United Kingdom for Cheadle
Members of the Parliament of the United Kingdom for Hazel Grove
Royal Army Medical Corps officers
Life peers created by Elizabeth II